"We Are One" is a song by the American hard rock band Kiss released on their 1998 album Psycho Circus.

It is written and sung by vocalist/bassist Gene Simmons.

Released as a single in 1998, the song charted in only a few countries, and failed to chart in the United States and United Kingdom.

Charts
40 (Australian Singles Charts)

Personnel
Gene Simmons - electric guitar, lead and backing vocals
Paul Stanley - acoustic guitar, backing vocals 
Tommy Thayer - bass guitar, final guitar solo
Kevin Valentine - drums

References

Kiss (band) songs
1998 singles
Songs written by Gene Simmons
Song recordings produced by Bruce Fairbairn
1998 songs
Mercury Records singles
PolyGram singles